The Wilson Cup is the championship and trophy awarded annually to the Ontario University Athletics (OUA) men's basketball champion. The championship is played at the home of the highest remaining playoff seed from either the East or West Division, depending on the year.

History
The Wilson Cup was first awarded for the 1908-09 season by Harold Wilson of Toronto. The Cup was originally the championship trophy of the first Canadian Intercollegiate Athletic Union which existed until 1955 and despite its name, was composed only of Ontario and Quebec universities. The Cup was then inherited by the original CIAU's successor, the Ontario-Quebec Athletic Association which eventually became the OUA. Since the 1962-63 season the Wilson Cup winner has gone on to compete for the national championship W. P. McGee Trophy. The 2021 championship was cancelled due to the COVID-19 pandemic in Canada.

Current OUA Playoff Format
The 17 OUA teams are separated into two divisions: East and West. The top seeds in each division receive a bye in their respective division playoffs. The seeds ranked #3 and #4 play hosts to seeds #5 and #6 respectively, with the winners advancing to play the team seeded #1 or #2. 

In the crossover round, the highest remaining seed in the East Division hosts the lowest remaining seed in the West and vice versa. The two winners of this round receive the OUA's berths in the USports Men's Basketball Final 8 and contest a one game final for the Wilson Cup. 

The Wilson Cup final is hosted by the team from the West in even numbered years and by the East in odd numbered years. If two teams from the same division qualify for the final, then the host shall be the highest remaining seed.

Champions

Championships by team

References

U Sports trophies
Basketball competitions in Canada
U Sports basketball
Basketball trophies and awards